Lady Florence Mary Fagan,  (born 11 September 1939) is a former Lord Lieutenant of Hampshire, who served from 1994 until her retirement on 11 September 2014.

Early life and family
Fagan was born at Gonalston Hall, Nottinghamshire, England. Fagan's parents were Lt. Col. George Haliburton Foster Peel Vere-Laurie and Caroline Judith Francklin. 

She was married on 21 October 1960 to Captain Christopher Tarleton Feltrim Fagan, son of Christopher Frederick Feltrim Fagan and Helen Maud Tarleton  with whom she has had two sons; Christopher Hugh Tarleton Feltrim Fagan (died in a motor car accident in 1987) and James Tarleton Feltrim Fagan.

Charitable and public service
Lady Mary is chair of trustees of the Countess of Brecknock Hospice Trust. She is also a trustee of the Overlord Embroidery Trust, The Edwina Mountbatten and Leonora Children's Foundation, and Winchester Cathedral Trust.

She served as Chancellor of the University of Winchester from 2006 to 2014.

Honours
In the 2009 Birthday Honours, she was appointed a Dame Commander of the Royal Victorian Order (DCVO), and thereby granted the title dame. She was appointed a Lady Companion of the Order of the Garter (LG) on 23 April 2018, and thereby granted the title lady.

Affiliations
 Honorary Rear Admiral in the Royal Naval Reserve
 Honorary Colonel, 457 Battery RA
 Chairman of the Advisory Committee for Magistrates
 27 April 1998: Honorary Colonel, 78 (Fortress) Engineer Regiment (Volunteers)
 Honorary Colonel, Royal Electrical and Mechanical Engineers (Volunteers) 4th Division

Arms

Notes

References

External links

 Dame Mary Fagan opens new library at Barton Peveril College
 "Fagan meets The Tigers"

1939 births
Living people
Lord-Lieutenants of Hampshire
People from Newark and Sherwood (district)
Ladies Companion of the Garter
Dames Commander of the Royal Victorian Order
People associated with the University of Winchester
English justices of the peace
Royal Naval Reserve personnel